Latrobe Brewing Company was founded in 1893 in Latrobe, Pennsylvania as part of the Pittsburgh Brewing Company. Forced to close in 1920 due to prohibition, it was purchased by the Tito brothers and reopened in 1933 selling “Latrobe Old German” and “Latrobe Pilsner” beers. The year 1939 saw the introduction of Rolling Rock beer (famous for its small green bottles) and Latrobe became one of the largest breweries in the United States. It was purchased by Labatt Brewing Company in 1987, which in turn was purchased in 1995 by the Belgian brewing conglomerate corporation Interbrew, which merged later into InBev in 2004.

In May 2006, InBev announced that it was selling the Rolling Rock brands to Anheuser-Busch, (Budweiser), the largest brewer in the United States. This sale, however, excluded the brewery, leaving an uncertain future for the Latrobe brewery, which only continued producing the Rolling Rock Brands through July 31, when production was moved to an Anheuser-Busch facility in Newark, New Jersey.

On June 21, 2006, InBev signed a letter of intent with City Brewing Company from La Crosse, Wisconsin, "giving it exclusive rights for an undetermined time to negotiate a purchase of the plant."  City Brewing currently operates the historic G. Heileman Brewery in La Crosse. However, with the sale of the plant still in limbo, the Latrobe Brewing Company plant officially shut down on July 31, 2006, and the plant sat idle.

In September 2006, City Brewing Company agreed to purchase the brewery.

In March 2007, the brewery reopened its doors and produced "Samuel Adams." The Boston Beer Company signed a deal with the plant's current owners, City Brewing Company in April 2007 to produce beer in the plant. The Boston Beer Company had pledged 3 to 7 million dollars to upgrade the plant. It is estimated that 200,000 to 250,000 barrels of beer would be produced in the plant during the remainder of 2007.

In late October 2008 City Brewery-Latrobe laid off 70 workers, forcing a temporary shutdown, and had not brewed beer at the plant since November.  Boston Beer Co. has since moved their operations to an old Schaefer plant they purchased near Allentown, PA. In May 2009, Iron City Brewing signed a deal with City Brewing Co to once again begin producing beer at the plant, with brewing started in June and bottling/kegging production resumed in July 2009.

In July 2009 some Southampton brands (Double White, IPA, Altbier, Pumpkin, Imperial Porter) were moved to Latrobe from Lion Brewing.

In addition to Iron City Beer, City Brewing also produces Stoney's and Stoney's Light.

On December 8, 2009 City Brewing completed the installation of a can line and started canning in 12 and 16 ounce packages. A 24 ounce can line was expected to be completed in early 2010.

In 2012, Diageo moved production of the U.S. supply of Red Stripe from Jamaica to the U.S., with City Brewing Company making the beer in their Latrobe brewery. Guinness Blonde was also currently being brewed in this brewery.

On September 7, 2016 Diageo returned production of Red Stripe to Kingston.

References

External links 
 City Brewery website
 Rolling Rock website

Companies based in Westmoreland County, Pennsylvania
Beer brewing companies based in Pittsburgh
American companies established in 1893
Latrobe, Pennsylvania
Food and drink companies established in 1893
1893 establishments in Pennsylvania